The 1956 San Francisco State Gators football team represented San Francisco State College—now known as San Francisco State University—as a member of the Far Western Conference (FWC) during the 1956 NCAA College Division football season. Led by seventh-year head coach Joe Verducci, San Francisco State compiled an overall record of 5–5 with a mark of 4–1 in conference play, sharing the FWC title with the Cal Aggies and Humboldt State. For the season the team was outscored by its opponents 177 to 168. The Gators played home games at Cox Stadium in San Francisco.

Schedule

Notes

References

San Francisco State
San Francisco State Gators football seasons
Northern California Athletic Conference football champion seasons
San Francisco State Gators football